The 2016–17 Wichita State Shockers women's basketball team represents Wichita State University in the 2016–17 NCAA Division I women's basketball season. They play their home games at Charles Koch Arena, which has a capacity of 10,506. The Shockers, led by ninth year head coach Jody Adams-Birch through January 18 and then Linda Hargrove as interim head coach for the remainder of the season, are members of the Missouri Valley Conference. They finished the season 15–16, 9–9 in MVC play to finish in fifth place. They advanced to the quarterfinals of the Missouri Valley women's tournament where they lost to Drake.

This was the Shockers' final season as a member of the Missouri Valley Conference as the school announced on April 7, 2017 that it would be joining the American Athletic Conference effective July 1, 2017.

Roster

Schedule

|-
!colspan=9 style="background:#000; color:#FFC318;"| Exhibition

|-
!colspan=9 style="background:#000; color:#FFC318;"| Non-conference regular season

|-
!colspan=9 style="background:#000; color:#FFC318;"| Missouri Valley Conference regular season

|-
!colspan=9 style="background:#000; color:#FFC318;"| Missouri Valley Tournament

See also
2016–17 Wichita State Shockers men's basketball team

References

Wichita State Shockers women's basketball seasons
Wichita State